Motor coach can refer to

 Motor bus, under the Canadian  English usage of the term "coach"
 road coach (bus), a long-distance bus, in British English
 Motor coach (rail), a powered railway vehicle able to carry passengers and haul trailers
 Motor home